Abdallah Chahine (1894–1975) was a Lebanese pianist and tuner-technician who devised an "Oriental piano" capable of playing quarter tones.

Abdallah Chahine constructed his Oriental piano with the help of Austrian Hofmann. Wadia Sabra had already had an oriental piano manufactured by Pleyel in Paris, in 1920. As worded by Thomas Burkhalter,

In 1962, Chahine recorded a vinyl record with typical Oriental music.

Among the composers drawn to Chahine's microtonal instrument were Aloys Hába (1893–1973), Mohammed Abdel Wahab and Toufic Succar (1922–).

His family still owns a large music store in Beirut. His great-granddaughter Zeina Abirached has published a comicbook, Le piano oriental, about a character inspired by him.

References

Sources
 
 
 
 
 

1975 deaths
1894 births
Lebanese inventors
Lebanese pianists